Gusana is a genus of land planarians found in Chile.

Description 
Gusana was defined as land planarians with a broad, leaf-like body that tapers very abruptly anteriorly, giving it a triangular anterior end. The cutaneous musculature, both ventrally and dorsally, is partially sunk into the mesenchyma. The sensory border forms a thick edge around the ventral margin of the anterior end and the sensory pits are internally branched, differently from what occurs in most Neotropical land planarians. The copulatory apparatus has a small intra-antral penis papilla and the female canal enters the genital antrum ventrally.

Species 
The genus Gusana currently includes seven species:
Gusana cruciata 
Gusana hualpensis 
Gusana lata 
Gusana lujanae 
Gusana melipeucensis 
Gusana platei 
Gusana purensis

References 

Geoplanidae
Rhabditophora genera